Ram Miriyala is an Indian playback singer, record producer, music composer, film scorer, promo producer and songwriter.

Career 
Ram Miriyala initially worked in the corporate sector. He has also learned carnatic music for two years and could not continue due to personal reasons. He told The New Indian Express that these "two years made him fall in love with music". Later, he continued his career in Radio Mirchi as a promo producer. While working as the promo producer at the Radio Mirchi, in 2018, Ram along with his colleagues decided to form the music band Chowraasta. The primary idea of the band is to sing and produce Telugu folk songs in reggae genre. The band also includes Yashwanth Nag, Bala, Akshay, Anant and Srinivas.

The band started producing original songs in 2019, including "Oorellipota Mama" and "Maya", which became successful. These songs are based on the real-life issues in the society and made him popular due to which, he is commonly called as Chowraasta Ram. Speaking to The News Minute, Ram said that "We are not here for popularity. We are asking questions and hoping that people will think about it. It is an ongoing process and we will speak about issues that are close to our heart". The next year he has sung, composed and written "Cheyi Cheyi Kalapaku Ra" for the band during the COVID-19 lockdown in India. The song is produced to create awareness about the disease and the guidelines to be followed. Ram has stepped out of the band in 2020.

During the initial stage of Chowraasta band, Ram's first recorded song "Vagalaadi" (from the film Brochevarevarura) as a playback singer, which was released in April 2019. Reviewing the film's soundtrack, The Times of India's Neeshita Nyayapati wrote about the song that "It’s a classic Vivek Sagar song with a perfect blend of various musical mediums and the vocals, tune, lyrics and music are on-point".

Discography

As playback singer

As composer

Singles

Music videos

As songwriter

Other songs

Awards and nominations

References

External links 

People from East Godavari district
Telugu playback singers
Living people
Telugu film score composers
Film musicians from Andhra Pradesh
21st-century Indian composers
Indian songwriters
Indian lyricists
Telugu-language lyricists
Indian male playback singers
Singers from Andhra Pradesh
Indian male pop singers
Indian record producers
South Indian International Movie Awards winners
1987 births